The 15002 / 01 Dehradun Muzaffarpur Express is an Express train belonging to Indian Railways - North Eastern Railway zone that runs between Dehradun Terminal (DDN) & Muzaffarpur Junction (MFP) in India.

It operates as train number 15002 from Dehradun Terminal (DDN) to Muzaffarpur Junction (MFP) and as train number 15001 in the reverse direction serving the states of Uttarakhand & Uttar Pradesh.

Coaches

The 15002 / 01 Dehradun Muzaffarpur Express has 1 AC 2 tier, 5 AC 3 tier, 6 Sleeper Class, 3. General Unreserved 1 EOG & 1 SLR (Seating cum Luggage Rake) coaches. It does not carry a Pantry car coach.

As is customary with most train services in India, Coach Composition may be amended at the discretion of Indian Railways depending on demand.

Service

The 15002 Dehradun Muzaffarpur Express covers the distance of 1124 kilometres in 24 hours 40 mins (45.57 km/hr) & in 24 hours 00 mins as 15001 Muzaffarpur Dehradun  Express (46.83 km/hr).

As the average speed of the train is below , as per Indian Railways rules, its fare does not include a superfast surcharge.

Routeing

The 15002 / 01 Dehradun Muzaffarpur Express runs from Dehradun via Haridwar Junction, Laksar Junction, Bareilly, Lucknow Junction NR, Gorakhpur Junction to Muzaffarpur Junction.

Traction

As the route is fully electrified, it pulled by WAP 4,5 or 7of tugalkabad shed {TKD}

Timings

15002 Dehradun Muzaffarpur Express leaves Dehradun every Saturday at 15:30 hrs IST and reaches Muzaffarpur Junction at 16:10 hrs IST the next day.

15001 Muzaffarpur Dehradun Express leaves Muzaffarpur Junction every Monday at 14:00 hrs IST and reaches Dehradun at 14:00 hrs IST the next day.

References 

 https://www.youtube.com/watch?v=rpaKtqH-kA8
 http://trains.indiadekh.com/train-dehradun-muzaffarpur-rapti-ganga-express-number-15002.html

External links

Transport in Muzaffarpur
Trains from Dehradun
Named passenger trains of India
Rail transport in Uttar Pradesh
Express trains in India